Tician Tushi (born 2 April 2001) is a Swiss professional footballer who plays as a forward for Xamax on loan from Basel.

Club career
Tushi made his professional debut with Basel in a 2–1 Swiss Super League win over FC Thun on 22 May 2019.

On 7 January 2022, Tushi was loaned to Winterthur until the end of the season.

On 30 January 2023, Tushi joined Xamax on loan.

International career
Tushi was born in Switzerland and is of Kosovan Albanian descent. He is a youth international for Switzerland.

References

External links
 
 SFL Profile
 SFV U16 Profile
 SFV U17 Profile
 SFV U18 Profile
 FuPa Profile

2001 births
Living people
Sportspeople from the canton of Solothurn
Swiss men's footballers
Switzerland youth international footballers
Swiss people of Kosovan descent
Swiss people of Albanian descent
Association football forwards
FC Basel players
FC Winterthur players
Neuchâtel Xamax FCS players
Swiss Super League players
Swiss Challenge League players
Swiss Promotion League players